Joe Caffrey (born 1966) is an English actor of theatre, television, and film.

History
Caffrey was born in the shipbuilding town of Wallsend, Northumberland. His father had worked at Swan Hunter's Shipyards and both of his grandfathers were miners. Joe's grandfather, Ned Murray, was an active Trade Unionist and Labour politician as well as a District Councilor. His mother, Lynne, is a Councillor in Gateshead.

Caffrey chose to become an actor and was trained for three years at the London Academy of Music and Dramatic Art. In 1984-85 he was also a member of the a cappella band, The Workey Tickets, who did several fund raising gigs, including a gig at the Albert Hall in London, for the striking miners and their families.

Caffrey first began performing theatre in London. He achieved West End stardom in Lee Hall's farce Cooking with Elvis. He had also several TV appearances in ITV and BBC productions and appeared in the Bridget Jones film, The Edge of Reason (2004).

He played Billy's older brother Tony in the original London cast of Billy Elliot the Musical and then returned to the show in December 2008, this time in the role of Jackie Elliot, Billy's father.

According to his own words, Caffrey is a huge fan of playwright Alan Plater. He says: "When you get a writer of Alan's calibre saying 'I'm going to write you a part in this' you think 'Christ almighty, most actors would bite your hand off for that kind of chance.'"

Caffrey is associated with Live Theatre which is a small theatre on Newcastle's Quayside, which has nurtured actors that now perform in The Pitmen Painters who have progressed to London's West End and Broadway.

Career
Joe Caffrey's career began at the age of 22 after leaving the London Academy of Music and Dramatic Art (LAMDA).

Joe's TV and film credits include
Clay (2008)  BBC   .... Dennis Hagen
Doctors      BBC     D.I. Matthew Squires (14 episodes, 2007)
Shreds (2007) TV episode .... D.I. Matthew Squires
Blind Drunk (2007) TV episode .... D.I. Matthew Squires
Lonely Hearts (2007) TV episode .... D.I. Matthew Squires
Invisible Touch (2007) TV episode .... D.I. Matthew Squires
Second Helpings (2007) TV episode .... D.I. Matthew Squires
Heartbeat   ITV    Seth Mottram (1 episode, 2006)
This Happy Breed
The Bill     ITV    Ben Perkins (14 episodes, 2004-2005)
375 (2005) TV episode .... Ben Perkins
374 (2005) TV episode .... Ben Perkins
371 (2005) TV episode .... Ben Perkins
352 (2005) TV episode .... Ben Perkins
326 (2005) TV episode .... Ben Perkins
Distant Shores   ITV   Maurice (1 episode, 2005)
Byker Grove     BBC   Paul / ... (10 episodes, 1990-1993 & 2004)
Episode No. 16.15 (2004) TV episode .... Alan Best
Episode No. 16.13 (2004) TV episode .... Alan Best
Episode No. 16.12 (2004) TV episode .... Alan Best
Episode No. 16.9 (2004) TV episode .... Alan Best
Episode No. 4.18 (1992) TV episode .... Paul
Attachments .... Matt (1 episode, 2000)
Money Shot
The Last Musketeer (2000) ITV  .... Joe Salter
Holby City .... Les (1 episode, 1999)
Search for the Hero (1999) TV episode .... Les
Badger .... Chef (1 episode, 1999)
It's a Jungle Out There (1999) TV episode .... Chef
Colour Blind (1998) TV mini-series .... Tony (unknown episodes)
... aka Catherine Cookson's Colour Blind (UK: complete title)

Hetty Wainthropp Investigates .... Jake Vincent (1 episode, 1997)
Daughter of the Regiment (1997) TV episode .... Jake Vincent
Soldier Soldier    ITV.... Fus Peter Shortland (1 episode, 1996)
Beast
Fighting for Gemma ITV   (1993) .... Russell
Spender .... Gene Hackett (1 episode, 1991)
Double Jeopardy

Film work includes
In Fading Light  Amber Films/Film 4 (1989) .... Yopper
Women in Tropical Places Film 4  (1989) .... Jerry

Joe has also been involved in writing and performing in some sketches for the charity event, Sunday for Sammy in 2006, 2008 and 2010.

Theatre

 Cooking With Elvis (1998-2001) by Lee Hall - Live Theatre - Dad/Elvis
 We the People (2007) by Eric Schlosser -  Shakespeare's Globe - Gerry
 Love's Labour's Lost (2007) -  Shakespeare's Globe - Costard
 Much Ado About Nothing (2011) -  Shakespeare's Globe - Borachio / Friar

In December 2008, Joe Caffrey rejoined the cast of Billy Elliot as Jackie Elliot, Billy's dad.

References

External links
 

1966 births
Living people
English male stage actors
English male television actors
English male film actors
20th-century English male actors
21st-century English male actors
Alumni of the London Academy of Music and Dramatic Art
People from Wallsend
Male actors from Tyne and Wear